The Wilkinson County School District is a public school district based in Woodville, Mississippi (USA). The district's boundaries parallel that of Wilkinson County. In addition to Woodville, the district includes the Wilkinson County portions of Centreville and Crosby.

Schools
Wilkinson County High School (Unincorporated area near Woodville)
William Winans Middle School (Centreville)
Wilkinson County Elementary School (Unincorporated area with Wilkinson County High School)
Finch Elementary School (Unincorporated area near Centreville)

Demographics

2007-08 school year
There were a total of 1,371 students enrolled in the Wilkinson County School District during the 2007–2008 school year. The gender makeup of the district was 49% female and 51% male. The racial makeup of the district was 99.56% African American, 0.36% White, and 0.07% Hispanic.

Previous school years

Accountability statistics

See also

List of school districts in Mississippi
Wilkinson County Christian Academy, a school founded in 1969 as a segregation academy.

References

External links
 

Education in Wilkinson County, Mississippi
School districts in Mississippi